Ault is a statutory town located in Weld County, Colorado, United States. The town population was 1,887 at the 2020 United States Census, a +24.23% increase since the 2010 United States Census. Ault is a part of the Greeley, CO Metropolitan Statistical Area and the Front Range Urban Corridor.

History 
First called High Land, the town's name was changed to Burgdorff Siding, sometimes called Bergdorf Switch (after a railroad worker, who was deceased in an accident), before it acquired its current name in 1897.  The town was named after Alexander Ault, a Fort Collins, Colorado resident and owner of a flour mill. Mr. Ault had helped to avert financial disaster to the agricultural base by purchasing the entire grain harvest during a year of severe economic hardship. The town was incorporated in 1904.

Much of the residential area of the town, as well as surrounding farmland, is on land given by the United States government to the Union Pacific Railroad, to be sold to finance railroad construction.  A north–south segment of the railroad connecting Denver, Colorado, and Cheyenne, Wyoming, passes through the town, parallel to U.S. Highway 85.
On February 21, 1910, Rabbi I. Idleson of Denver, Colorado, purchased  for farming purposes near Ault, proposing "to employ Jewish farmers and devote land to practical philanthropy".  Little came of this venture, and within a few decades there were apparently no Jewish residents in the town.

Ault Public Emergency Radio Tower, a former emergency transmission facility, was located here.

Geography
Ault is located at  (40.583999, -104.733648), at the intersection of U.S. Highway 85 and State Highway 14.

Demographics

As of the census of 2000, there were 1,432 people, 540 households, and 381 families residing in the town. The racial makeup of the town was 79.47% White, 0.07% African American, 0.91% Native American, 0.42% Asian, 16.76% from other races, and 2.37% from two or more races. Hispanic or Latino of any race were 30.24% of the population.

There were 540 households, out of which 38.5% had children under the age of 18 living with them, 55.0% were married couples living together, 10.6% had a female 
householder with no husband present, and 29.4% were non-families. 26.1% of all households were made up of individuals, and 13.0% had someone living alone who was 65 years of age or older.  The average household size was 2.65 and the average family size was 3.20.

In the town, the population was spread out, with 30.6% under the age of 18, 8.8% from 18 to 24, 29.1% from 25 to 44, 19.6% from 45 to 64, and 11.9% who were 65 years of age or older.  The median age was 34 years. For every 100 females, there were 100.8 males.  For every 100 females age 18 and over, there were 92.6 males.

The median income for a household in the town was $33,846, and the median income for a family was $43,304. Males had a median income of $32,270 versus $23,482 for females. The per capita income for the town was $15,570.  About 5.9% of families and 9.1% of the population were below the poverty line, including 10.4% of those under age 18 and 9.5% of those age 65 or over.

Other 
"AULT" is sometimes used as an acronym - "A Unique Little Town."
Ault hosts two annual town festivals.  The ironically-named Fall Festival, which takes place in August, features food, booths, contests and a street dance.  The theme of the 2006 Fall Festival was "It's Your Fault if You're Not in Ault!"  The theme of the 2007 Fall Festival was "Remembering Not To Forget."  Every October, the International Food Fest allows local residents to show off their cultural roots.
Scenes from the 1977 film "One on One", starring Robby Benson and featuring a young Melanie Griffith, were filmed in various Ault locations.
Ault's only high school is named "Highland High School", which was changed from "Ault High School" when it combined with schools in nearby towns Pierce, Nunn and Carr, Colorado, in 1963. The Highland School District name comes from the high plains location, rather than the earlier name of the town of Ault, and there is no indication that the early name played any part in the naming decision. Highland High School's mascot is the Husky.

See also

Colorado
Bibliography of Colorado
Index of Colorado-related articles
Outline of Colorado
List of counties in Colorado
List of municipalities in Colorado
List of places in Colorado
List of statistical areas in Colorado
Front Range Urban Corridor
North Central Colorado Urban Area
Denver-Aurora, CO Combined Statistical Area
Greeley, CO Metropolitan Statistical Area

References

External links

Town of Ault website
CDOT map of the Town of Ault
Ault Page on Colorado.com

Towns in Weld County, Colorado
Towns in Colorado